Fremont Peak State Park is a California State Park located in Monterey County and San Benito County, California. The park encompasses the summit of  Fremont Peak in the Gabilan Range.

The park features expansive views of Monterey Bay and Pacific Ocean from its hiking trails. Other vistas include the San Benito Valley, Salinas Valley, and the Santa Lucia Mountains east of Big Sur. The  park was established in 1934.

Natural history
Pine and California oak woodlands, of the California chaparral and woodlands ecoregion, cover much of the park and are home to many birds and mammals.

Recreation
Fremont Peak State Park has hiking trails, picnic facilities and 22 campsites (both tent and RV).  Fremont Peak Day is held every April, and features a picnic and other activities.

The Fremont Peak Observatory opened in 1986, and has operated every summer since, despite having battled the frequently brutal mountaintop weather.  The astronomical observatory has a  telescope.

Proposed for closure
Fremont Peak State Park was one of the 48 California state parks proposed for closure in January 2008 by Governor Arnold Schwarzenegger as part of a deficit reduction program. The closures were ultimately avoided by cutting hours and maintenance system-wide.

See also
List of California state parks
George H. Moore, Los Angeles City Council member 1943–51, chairman of a group that established the park

References

External links 
 Parks.ca.gov: official Fremont Peak State Park website

State parks of California
Parks in Monterey County, California
Parks in San Benito County, California
Gabilan Range
Protected areas established in 1934
1934 establishments in California
Parks in the San Francisco Bay Area